Mohd Reza bin Mohd Sany (born 13 August 1963 in Kuala Lumpur) is a Malaysian admiral who serves as 17th Chief of Royal Malaysian Navy.

Mohd Reza was retired on 26 January 2023 after 42 years of service in Navy.

Honours
  :
  Officer of the Order of the Defender of the Realm (KMN) (2007)
  Commander of the Order of Loyalty to the Royal Family of Malaysia (PSD) – Datuk (2014)
  Commander of the Order of Loyalty to the Crown of Malaysia (PSM) – Tan Sri (2019)
  Malaysian Armed Forces :
  General Service Medal (PPA)
  Loyal Service Medal (PPS)
  Malaysian Service Medal (PJM)
  Officer of The Most Gallant Order of Military Service (KAT)
  Warrior of The Most Gallant Order of Military Service (PAT)
  Loyal Commander of The Most Gallant Order of Military Service (PSAT)
 Courageous Commander of The Most Gallant Order of Military Service (PGAT) (2021)
 
  Knight Commander of the Order of Taming Sari (DPTS) – Dato’ Pahlawan (2011)
 
  Knight Companion of the Order of Loyalty to the Royal House of Kedah (DSDK) – Dato’ (2014)
 
  Commander of the Order of the Territorial Crown (PMW) – Datuk (2016)
  :
  Knight Commander of the Order of the Crown of Selangor (DPMS) – Dato’ (2018)
  :
  Knight Commander of the Order of the Defender of State (DPPN) – Dato’ Seri (2020)

References

1963 births
Living people
Officers of the Order of the Defender of the Realm
Commanders of the Order of Loyalty to the Royal Family of Malaysia
Commanders of the Order of Loyalty to the Crown of Malaysia
Knights Commander of the Order of the Crown of Selangor
Royal Malaysian Navy personnel